Egal or Égal may refer to:

People
 Ali Sugule Egal (1936–2016), Somali composer, poet and playwright
 Fabienne Égal (born 1954), French announcer and television host
 Liban Abdi Egal, Somali entrepreneur
 Muhammad Haji Ibrahim Egal (1928–2002), Somali politician
 Yasin Ali Egal (born 1991), Somali international footballer
 Egal Shidad, Somali folk hero that was known as the brave coward

Other uses
 "Égal" (song), 1981 song by Amanda Lear
 Equal (sweetener), known in French Canada as Égal
 Egalitarianism (French: égal), school of thought that prioritizes equality for all people

Somali-language surnames